Charisse Anne "Cha" Claudio Hernandez-Alcantara (born September 8, 1993) is a Filipina politician who currently serves as Representative from Calamba's lone district since 2022. She previously served as councilor of Calamba from 2016 to 2022.

References 

1993 births
Living people
Women members of the House of Representatives of the Philippines
Members of the House of Representatives of the Philippines from Laguna (province)
People from Calamba, Laguna
Filipino Christians
Filipino evangelicals
Lakas–CMD politicians
21st-century Filipino women politicians
Filipino city and municipal councilors